Nagycsepely is a village in Somogy county, Hungary.

Etymology
Its name derives from the older Hungarian word csepely or cseplye.

External links 
 Street map (Hungarian)

References 

Populated places in Somogy County